Arizkun is a village located in the municipality of Baztan, Navarre, Spain.

Hamlets
Arizkun is composed of the following hamlets:
 Aintzinalde
 Arizkun (main village)
 Bozate
 Ordoki
 Pertalats

See also 
 Cagot, a population which was last segregated in this area

References 

Populated places in Navarre